Tom & Jerry (marketed as Tom & Jerry: The Movie) is a 2021 American live-action/computer-animated slapstick comedy film based on the titular cartoon characters of the same name created by William Hanna and Joseph Barbera, produced by Warner Animation Group and distributed by Warner Bros. Pictures. It is the second theatrical film based on the characters, following Tom and Jerry: The Movie (1992), and the third to animate them in the contemporary real world with humans, following Anchors Aweigh (1945) and Dangerous When Wet (1953), like the original cartoons. The film's story follows Tom enlisted to catch Jerry, before his presence ruins New York City's fanciest hotel and its planned wedding.

The film is directed by Tim Story and written by Kevin Costello. It stars Chloë Grace Moretz, Michael Peña, Colin Jost, Rob Delaney, Pallavi Sharda, Jordan Bolger, Patsy Ferran, and Ken Jeong in live-action roles, with Nicky Jam, Bobby Cannavale, and Lil Rel Howery in voice roles. The titular characters are voiced by William Hanna via archival recordings, with additional vocals from Kaiji Tang and André Sogliuzzo (though the characters are listed as themselves in the credits). Starting with a live-action film in 2009, to an animated film in 2015, and to a hybrid film blending stylized animation and live-action in 2018 (with filming beginning in 2019), the film languished in development hell as the studio spent years finding a writer to pen the most faithful take on the franchise and characters for a feature film. Warner Bros. executives wanted the film to “be what Tom and Jerry is”, as the studio “understands how much of its history is rooted in these iconic characters”. Many elements from the original cartoons were featured in the film. Such as their sound effects, Tom being a jazz pianist, Tom's Rube Goldberg mouse trap, Jerry's heartbeat, Jerry's theft of food and items, and some of the titular characters' voice tracks from William Hanna.

Tom & Jerry was theatrically released by Warner Bros. Pictures in the United States on February 26, 2021, alongside a one-month streaming release on HBO Max. The film was a box office success, grossing $136 million worldwide on a $79 million production budget, but received negative-to-mixed reviews from critics, criticizing its human characters and screenplay, but praising its blend of classic animation and live-action, performances (particularly Moretz's), soundtrack, nostalgic feel, and faithfulness to its source material.

Plot 

In a world co-populated by humans and cartoon animals, Tom Cat, who dreams of becoming a pianist, moves to Manhattan and buskes in Central Park, while Jerry Mouse is in search of a new home. After Tom's keyboard is destroyed in an altercation, he chases Jerry, but accidentally tackles a young woman named Kayla Forester, causing her to lose her job. Down on her luck, Kayla wants to prove her talents and looks for a position at New York's fanciest hotel, the Royal Gate, where Jerry moves in and Tom fails to break in. Kayla, with a stolen resume, is hired to help plan a high-profile wedding and gets a tour of the hotel, while Jerry's usual antics involve stealing food and items to ramp up his new home, and Tom plans more strategies to enter the hotel and capture Jerry.

Local celebrities Preeta Mehta and her fiancé Ben are greeted, as they arrive, along with their pets Spike and Toots. All, except for Spike, are unaware of Jerry stealing from Preeta's handbag. As the couple and their pets are escorted to their room, Jerry's presence is revealed, which puts the wedding and the hotel at risk. Kayla offers to catch Jerry, but fails and realizes that he'll be hard to catch. After many failed attempts, Tom successfully enters the hotel, and his ensuing chase after Jerry wrecks a hotel room. Due to noise complaints, Kayla comes to check, but she befriends Tom, due to their shared goal of catching Jerry. Owner Mr. Dubros hires Tom to exterminate Jerry, while Tom and Kayla's boss Terence threatens to fire them if Tom can't catch Jerry.

After many failed attempts, Tom designs an elaborate mouse trap and gets Jerry out of the hotel. Meanwhile, Kayla helps with the wedding plans and learns from Preeta that her engagement ring is missing. Jerry returns, to clash with Tom, and reveals to Kayla that he had Preeta's ring and agrees to give it back to her if she lets him live in the hotel. Before Kayla can agree, Terence returns from walking Spike and notices Tom looking for Jerry hiding in Kayla's coat pocket, but creates a huge scene that causes Spike, Tom, and Jerry to destroy the hotel's lobby. Terence is suspended, while Kayla is promoted to event manager, for returning Preeta's ring. Kayla tells Tom and Jerry that they will have to get along and spend the next day bonding if they want to stay in the hotel, to which they reluctantly agree. 

While Kayla takes care of the hotel and manages the wedding with the crew, Tom and Jerry explore the city, but are imprisoned at a pound, after inadvertently disrupting a New York Yankees baseball game, by committing fan interference. A vengeful Terence separately visits Tom and Jerry and feeds them lies about what they said about each other behind their back, inciting them to a battle at the ceremony that throws the wedding into carnage and destroys the rest of the hotel. After Kayla comes clean and leaves in humiliation, Terence evicts Tom, and Preeta renounces the wedding. A sorrowful Tom and Jerry put their differences aside, and convince Kayla and the hotel crew, including a skeptical Terence, to salvage the wedding. While the pair lure Preeta and Toots to Central Park, where the wedding is held at.

Kayla promises to Preeta that Tom and Jerry have atoned for their behavior, and Ben apologizes to Preeta for his extensive expenses, in light of impressing her dad. Kayla and the stolen resume's owner reconcile with each other and get jobs at the hotel, while Tom strives to be a pianist and plays the piano for Toots, with Jerry joining the party, until a mishap causes them to fight again. In the post-credit scene, Ben receives a bill for both weddings.

Cast 

Chloë Grace Moretz as Kayla Judith Forester, a young inexperienced wedding planner of the Royal Gate Hotel who enlists Tom to catch Jerry
Michael Peña as Terence Mendoza, a mean deputy general manager of the Royal Gate Hotel, and the boss of Tom and Kayla
Colin Jost as Ben, the groom of the Royal Gate Hotel's planned wedding and Spike's owner
Rob Delaney as Mr. Henry Dubros, a wealthy, friendly general manager and owner of the Royal Gate Hotel
Pallavi Sharda as Preeta Mehta, the bride of the Royal Gate Hotel's planned wedding, and Toots' owner
Jordan Bolger as Cameron, a bartender at the Royal Gate Hotel
Patsy Ferran as Joy the Bell Girl, a socially awkward Royal Gate Hotel bellhop

Ken Jeong as Chef Jackie, a chef and baker of the Royal Gate Hotel
Paolo Bonolis as Wedding guest
Ozuna as Assistant hotel staff

Voice and animated cast 

Tom as Himself, an accident-prone bicolor cat who is enlisted by Kayla to get Jerry out of the Royal Gate Hotel
He does not have a speaking role, but T-Pain voices his singing, with archived vocals from the late William Hanna, and additional ones provided by Kaiji Tang.
Jerry as Himself, a cheeky house mouse who moves in at the Royal Gate Hotel
He does not have a speaking role, but his vocals are archived from the late William Hanna, with additional ones provided by André Sogliuzzo.
Bobby Cannavale as Spike, Ben's brutish yet goofy American bulldog who clashes with Tom
Nicky Jam as Butch, a disgruntled black cat who leads a gang of alley cats that pursue Tom
The Plastic Cup Boyz as the Alley Cats:
Joey Wells as Lightning
Harry Ratchford as Topsy
Na'im Lynn as Meathead
Spank Horton as Ash
Lil Rel Howery as Angel/Devil Tom, Tom's shoulder angel and shoulder devil
Utkarsh Ambudkar as Real Estate Rat, a rat who works as a real estate agent
Tim Story as Pigeon Announcer, a singing pigeon
Jeff Bergman as Droopy (uncredited cameo) 

Other Tom and Jerry characters who appear in non-speaking roles include Toots, Goldie the Goldfish, and Clyde.

Production

Development 
In 2009, plans for a new Tom and Jerry film were announced, as a live-action/CGI hybrid film set to be produced by Dan Lin with a script written by Eric Gravning, following the success of Alvin and the Chipmunks. It would've followed Tom and Jerry's origins over a Chicago backdrop, where they reluctantly work together to get back home.

On April 6, 2015, plans shifted from a live-action film to a CGI-animated film, with a script written by Bryan Schulz and Cornelius Uliano. It would've followed a young family moving into a New England country house inhabited by Jerry, prompting them to adopt Tom to get rid of him, until the duo learn the meaning of family and friendship, once they team up to protect the family and their house from an outside threat. Parts of the script ended up being recycled for Tom and Jerry: Cowboy Up!.

On October 2018, Tim Story was hired to direct a Tom and Jerry film set to be a "blend of classic animation and live-action", inspired by Who Framed Roger Rabbit's technique,  which would begin filming in 2019, with a script written by Kevin Costello that was pitched in 2017 and purely influenced from the original cartoons. It was reported that Story immediately mentioned his "admiration for the characters and how he'd love tackling that property.", when he was in discussions with Warner Bros. executives about what he was interested in directing. Claiming that it was his dream project to direct a Tom and Jerry film. While Costello's idea was to place the cat and mouse in a fancy New York hotel set to plan an Indian wedding. Director Tim Story, producer Chris DeFaria, and writer Kevin Costello also all agreed to use the classic shorts, and even pictures of them taped in the production office, as reference material for the film, which the studio gave them access to. In addition to the original Tom and Jerry theatrical shorts and Who Framed Roger Rabbit, the film also took inspiration from silent cinema. During production, Story also ran through many of the classic shorts from memory, went back to read about the franchise's history, and even re-watched some Charlie Chaplin, for inspiration in the film's additional humor and storytelling with silent characters. He also hoped the film will appeal to longtime fans and a new generation of audiences.

Casting 
In March 2019, it was reported that Zoey Deutch and Olivia Cooke were frontrunners for the lead live-action role of Kayla, "who teams up with Tom to stop the pesky Jerry from ruining an important event for herself." Additionally, Sofia Carson, Elle Fanning, Jennifer Lawrence, Ariel Winter, Naomi Scott, Meg Donnelly, Hailee Steinfeld, Yara Shahidi, Kelly Marie Tran, Becky G and Isabela Moner were all in consideration for the role. In April, Chloë Grace Moretz was in final negotiations to star in the film. Moretz described Kayla as "a lot like Jerry" and as "a girl who gunned for what she wanted to achieve but realizes that time and honesty is what will prevail in the end", as well as "a total goofball", the latter aspect which allowed Moretz to "lean into who [she is] in real life". She also said Kayla is "a little unlikeable with some of the decisions she makes", yet she still wanted the character to feel likeable. Moretz was inspired in her performance by Bob Hoskins' performance as Eddie Valiant in Who Framed Roger Rabbit, as well as by actresses Sandra Bullock, Jennifer Aniston, Lucille Ball, and Meg Ryan. Moretz, an avid fan of the source material, says the film "really does harken back to the Tom and Jerry we love.". When she was first given the script, she was openly anxious about the film and worried that a more modern take on the characters wouldn't work. She ended up being proud of the film's faithfulness to the material and characters, and felt it's a great way to introduce them to a new generation of audiences.

Later that month, in March 2019, it was reported that Peter Dinklage was considered for the role of Terrance, Kayla's boss and the human antagonist of the film. In May 2019, Michael Peña joined the cast in the role Dinklage was eyed for. Colin Jost, Ken Jeong, Rob Delaney, Jordan Bolger and Pallavi Sharda were added to the cast in July. Patsy Ferran was revealed to be part of the cast in September 2019. Besides Moretz, Peña, Jost, Jeong, Delaney, Bolger, Sharda and Ferran have also all grown up with Tom and Jerry, and were thrilled to take their roles. According to director Tim Story, "Everybody knew exactly what this movie is about. Everybody knew those characters. Everybody was starting with a shared knowledge of these characters and kind of got what the movie should be.".

In November 2020, Nicky Jam and Lil Rel Howery revealed that they have been cast in the film in voice roles. On December 2, 2020, Jam revealed that he will be the voice of Butch Cat in the film.

Filming 
Principal photography began in July 2019 at Warner Bros. Studios, Leavesden in Hertfordshire, England. The film was shot by cinematographer Alan Stewart, on the Sony VENICE cinema cameras and Panavision Primo 70 and Primo Artiste Lenses. Animators were present during filming, allowing cast members to improvise, while figures of the animated characters were handled by puppeteers and designed to maintain their exact size, to help make the animation and live-action integration more seamless. Filming ended on September 2019, before the industry's temporary shutdown in response to the COVID-19 pandemic.

Visual effects and animation 
Both visual effects and animation services were provided by Framestore, who tried to make the film's animation replicate traditional animation, and hired 3D animators with experience in 2D animation to animate the characters. The animators used a stylized CGI VFX medium to help create animation techniques and custom tools used for 2D animation, to replicate the original 1940s and 1950s Tom and Jerry theatrical shorts' 2D-animated character art style, character designs and character movements. The animators also used these shorts as reference for the animation sequences. Work on the animation was done remotely during the pandemic, with the filmmakers doing creative exploration on certain shots, and finalizing material through production groups. Numerous animators from films like Who Framed Roger Rabbit and Space Jam have also been involved with its animation. Director Tim Story passionately coined the term "2D+ animation", as stylizing 3D animation to embrace the look and feel of 2D animation.

Additional animation work was done to its backgrounds, as the artists also aimed to recreate the original cartoons' vintage real world settings. They used the classic shorts, as reference for its production design, like shading the vibrant sky with 2D animation and saturating the color palette. The 1945 short “Mouse in Manhattan” was also used as reference for its camerawork, to help recreate that short's sense and feel.

Music and sound design 
On July 22, 2020, it was announced that Tim Story's recurring collaborator and composer Christopher Lennertz was set to compose the score of the film. The album was released by WaterTower Music on February 12, having 30 tracks. For the film's music, Lennertz revisited the original cartoons' music (and use of jazz) as inspiration, but also added more genres (like some Indian music and some hip-hop; most were still jazz-influenced) into the mix to be inclusive to more cultures in every generation possible. An exclusive Tom and Jerry theme tune also played in the movie's end credits, 
while a short version of it is also available on the soundtrack.

For its sound design, editor Peter S. Elliot used many sound effects from the MGM Cartoon library, and edited them, to sound beefier. Director Tim Story promised that "audiences will hear the sound effects they’re used to, as Tom and Jerry chase after each other and destroy everything in their path". Including some of Tom's screams and Jerry's laughs from the archives.

Release

Theatrical and streaming 
Tom and Jerry was released in the United States on February 26, 2021, by Warner Bros. Pictures, in theaters and for a month streaming on HBO Max. The movie coincidentally released on Tex Avery's birthdate, in which the movie stars for a brief second one of Avery's characters, Droopy, in an animal shelter and on a Joker parody billboard. It is the first film to officially debut the new Warner Animation Group logo to match with the new shield that Warner Bros. debuted in November 2019. It was originally scheduled to be released on April 16, 2021, but was pushed up to December 23, 2020. The film was then pushed back to March 5, 2021, due to the COVID-19 pandemic, before moving up a week in order to avoid competition with Disney's Raya and the Last Dragon. Samba TV estimated that 1.2 million U.S. households streamed the film over its opening weekend on HBO Max. By the end of its first month, the film was watched in over 2.6 million U.S. households.

On March 8, 2021, some HBO Max viewers who attempted to watch the film were accidentally shown Zack Snyder's Justice League, a movie which was supposed to release 10 days later. HBO Max quickly fixed the issue within two hours.

Marketing 

A float of the characters appeared in the 94th Macy's Thanksgiving Day Parade to promote the film.

On September 1, 2020, it was announced that Australian toy company Moose Toys made a deal with Warner Bros. to make merchandise for the film.

On February 20, 2021, Warner Bros. released two new shorts onto HBO Max titled Tom and Jerry Special Shorts to honor the 81st anniversary of Tom and Jerry, as well as to promote the film. These shorts share the same animation style and come from the same crew of HBO Max's new Looney Tunes Cartoons, also produced by Warner Bros. Animation. The shorts were removed a month later for unknown reasons, but were brought back on July 8, 2021. The film's writer, Kevin Costello, has also seen the shorts and acclaimed them.

On March 6, 2021, Rob Delaney had been the star guest Announcer for Ant & Dec's Saturday Night Takeaway, whereas the titular characters made an appearance themselves with Sir Tom Jones.

Home media 
The film was available for rent on April 16, while Warner Bros. Home Entertainment released it on DVD, Blu-ray, and digital on May 18, 2021.

Reception

Box office 
Tom and Jerry grossed $46.5 million in the United States and Canada, and $90 million in other territories, for a worldwide total of $136.5 million.

In the United States and Canada, the film grossed $4 million from 2,479 theaters on its first day of release. It went on to debut to $14.1 million, the second-best opening weekend of the pandemic behind Warner Bros.'s December release Wonder Woman 1984 ($16.7 million). The opening weekend audiences were 51% female and 46% under the age of 17, while 35% was Hispanic, 33% Caucasian, 21% African American, and 11% Asian. David Gross, who runs the movie consulting firm Franchise Entertainment Research, said of the figure: "With half of theaters still closed, the pandemic still a threat, and Tom & Jerry available at home, this is a very good opening." In its second weekend the film grossed $6.6 million and in its third made $4 million, finishing second behind newcomer Raya and the Last Dragon both times.

The film was initially released in seven international markets, grossing $1.45 million; Singapore led with $457,000. By its second weekend of international release the film was playing in 16 markets, including debuting at number one in Brazil ($746,000) and Mexico ($395,000).

Critical response 
On Rotten Tomatoes the film has an approval rating of 30% based on 130 reviews, with an average rating of 4.7/10. The site's critics consensus reads, "It isn't the worst of the long-squabbling duo's feature-length adventures, but Tom & Jerry is disappointingly short on the anarchic spirit of their classic shorts." On Metacritic, the film a has weighted average score of 32 out of 100 based on 20 critics, the film received "generally unfavorable reviews". Audiences polled by CinemaScore gave the film an average grade of "A−" on an A+ to F scale, while PostTrak reported 79% of audience members gave it a positive score, with 60% saying they would definitely recommend it.

The Hollywood Reporters John DeFore said that audiences should just "rewatch Roger Rabbit instead" and wrote: "Tim Story's Tom & Jerry is five to ten minutes of action that might have worked in one of the cartoon duo's shorts, surrounded by an inordinate amount of unimaginative, unfunny human-based conflict." Kevin Maher of The Times gave the film a score of 1 out of 5 stars, writing: "nothing will prepare you for the tone-deaf nature of this live-action abomination that inserts our cartoon protagonists, Who Framed Roger Rabbit-style, into a crass Manhattan misadventure about a celebrity wedding gone awry." Benjamin Lee of The Guardian gave the film a score of 2 out of 5 stars, writing: "While there's little to truly loathe in Fantastic Four and Ride Along director Tim Story's frantic new take on Tom & Jerry, there's also an equal lack of anything to truly love; this is a serviceable, if entirely forgettable attempt to relaunch an old property for a new audience." Clarisse Loughrey of The Independent gave the film a score of 1 out of 5 stars, describing it as "the cinematic equivalent of a sausage casing stuffed with mystery meat", though she praised Moretz's performance.

Matt Fowler of IGN gave the film a score of 6/10, and wrote: "Tom & Jerry is a sufficient family offering with a cool cast, a sparkling soundtrack, and occasional fun. It's too bad that Tom and Jerry often feel like afterthoughts in their own film and that there wasn't much more for them to do other than serve the story of others." Charlotte O'Sullivan of the Evening Standard gave the film a score of 3 out of 5 stars, writing: "Ignore catty reviews that present this caper as soulless. Though horribly flawed, its internal organs are in the right place." A staff of The Banner named Brooke Price, who also mentions the film's production as reference, was positive on the film, praising its nostalgic feel, its blend of classic animation and live-action, and its faithfulness to the source material. Peter Debruge of Variety was also positive on the film and said: "Truth be told, the movie's a pretty faithful extension of the frenemies' long-running feud — basically, the two cannot peacefully coexist under the same roof — and as such, we should be grateful to director Tim Story (Shaft) and screenwriter Kevin Costello (Brigsby Bear) for not dropping a two-ton anvil on our nostalgia, the way so many big-studio toonsploitation projects have in recent years."

Accolades

Television spin-off and possible sequel
Tom and Jerry in New York is an HBO Max original animated series produced by Warner Bros. Animation (outsourced by Renegade Animation, the team behind the 2014 Cartoon Network TV series The Tom and Jerry Show) that is a follow-up to the film, which follows Tom and Jerry as new residents of the Royal Gate Hotel, with their usual antics and mayhem to follow them all over the hotel, across Manhattan, New York City and going beyond. It was released on July 1, 2021.

Director Tim Story and writer Kevin Costello have reportedly expressed interest in a sequel to the movie. They hope on planning to include even more characters from the original Tom and Jerry cartoons in it, such as Cousin Muscles and Uncle Pecos.

References 
 Text was copied from Tom and Jerry (2021 film) at Tom&Jerry Wiki, which is released under a Creative Commons Attribution-Share Alike 2.0 (Unported) (CC-BY-SA 3.0) license.

External links

 at warnerbros.com

2021 comedy films
2021 computer-animated films
2020s American animated films
2020s children's animated films
2020s English-language films
American children's animated adventure films
American children's animated comedy films
American computer-animated films
Animated films about cats
Animated films about mice
Animated films about dogs
Animated films about elephants
Animated films set in Manhattan
American films with live action and animation
Films about weddings
Films directed by Tim Story
Films produced by Sam Register
Films scored by Christopher Lennertz
Films set in 2020
Films set in hotels
Films shot at Warner Bros. Studios, Leavesden
Films shot in Hertfordshire
Films shot in New York City
Films postponed due to the COVID-19 pandemic
HBO Max films
Films about con artists
Reboot films
Tom and Jerry films
Warner Bros. films
Warner Animation Group films
Warner Bros. animated films